Visit or Memories and Confessions (Portuguese: Visita ou Memórias e Confissões) is a Portuguese documentary film directed by Manoel de Oliveira. It was released in Portugal on 4 May 2015.

Cast
Manoel de Oliveira
Maria Oliveira
Urbano Tavares Rodrigues
Teresa Madruga (voice)
Diogo Doria (voice)

Production
The film was shot in 1982.

Reception
Deborah Young of The Hollywood Reporter called it "a posthumous little jewel for Oliveira admirers."

References

External links

2015 documentary films
Films directed by Manoel de Oliveira
Portuguese documentary films